James H. Wilson was an English professional footballer who played in the Football League for Newcastle United as a goalkeeper.

Personal life 
Wilson served in the Royal Garrison Artillery during the First World War.

Career statistics

References 

English Football League players
Newcastle United F.C. players
English footballers
British Army personnel of World War I
Royal Garrison Artillery soldiers
Association football goalkeepers
Year of birth missing
Year of death missing
Place of death missing
Footballers from Newcastle upon Tyne
North Shields F.C. players
Military personnel from Newcastle upon Tyne